Muisca is a genus of checkered beetles of the subfamily of Clerinae or Enopliinae. It is only known from two species, the type species, Muisca bitaeniata and Muisca cylindricollis. The genus was first described by entomologist Maximilian Spinola in 1844.

Spinola contributed extensively to the entomological knowledge in the mid 19th century when specimens were brought to him from South America. The Muisca beetle was found in Colombia and part of the collection of Buquet.

In 1962 Brazilian zoologist  described a species Cregya cylindricollis. Peracchi later transferred this species to the genus Paracregya.  Paracregya cylindricollis was then reclassified as Muisca cylindricollis by Ekis in 1975.

Etymology 
The genus Muisca has been named after the Muisca of central Colombia.

Description 
The labium and maxilla of the black-striped red Muisca beetle are less wide than long. This differs from the genus Aulicus.

See also 

List of flora and fauna named after the Muisca

References 

Cleridae genera
Endemic fauna of Colombia
Arthropods of Colombia
Altiplano Cundiboyacense
Muysccubun